The Second Konoe Cabinet is the 38th Cabinet of Japan led by Fumimaro Konoe from July 22, 1940, to July 18, 1941.

Cabinet

References 

Cabinet of Japan
1940 establishments in Japan
Cabinets established in 1940
Cabinets disestablished in 1941